The 1985 Stockholm Open was a men's tennis tournament played on hard courts that was part of the 1985 Nabisco Grand Prix. It took place at the Kungliga tennishallen in Stockholm, Sweden. It was the 17th edition of the tournament and was held from 4 November through 10 November 1985. First-seeded John McEnroe won the singles title.

Finals

Singles

 John McEnroe defeated  Anders Järryd, 6–1, 6–2
 It was McEnroe's 8th singles title of the year and the 67th of his career.

Doubles

 Guy Forget /  Andrés Gómez defeated  Mike De Palmer /  Gary Donnelly, 6–3, 6–4

References

External links
 
 ITF tournament edition details

Stockholm Open
Stockholm Open
Stockholm Open
Stockholm Open
1980s in Stockholm